James Atkinson was the first mayor of Crewe, England.

References

Crewe
Mayors of places in Cheshire
Year of birth missing
Year of death missing